Christmas Songs by Sinatra is the name of the third studio album by the American singer Frank Sinatra. It was released in 1948 as a 78 rpm album set and a 10" LP record (CL 6019) featuring a collection of eight holiday songs. A compilation album was released in 1994 including the songs released on the 1948 album (three original takes; five previously unreleased alternate takes) along with other Christmas songs from his years recording at Columbia.

Columbia reissued the album several times in later years with alternate track listings and different artwork. 1957 saw the first 12" release as Christmas Dreaming (CL 1032) with the addition of "Christmas Dreaming (A Little Early This Year)" and "Let It Snow! Let It Snow! Let It Snow!", though the latter was dropped from later releases when the album was reissued and retitled as Have Yourself a Merry Little Christmas (Harmony HS 11200) in October 1966.  This version peaked at #42 on Billboards Best Bets For Christmas album chart on December 21, 1968.

A stylized paper craft version of the LP album with its original 1948 Christmas tree cover art is prominently featured in the official music video for Sinatra's "Let It Snow! Let It Snow! Let It Snow!". However, the 1948 version of the album did not contain the track.

Track listing

1948 78rpm 4-discDisc 1 (Columbia)A. "Silent Night" (8/27/45)
B. "Adeste Fideles" "(All Ye Faithful)" (8/8/46)Disc 2 (Columbia)A. "White Christmas" (11/14/44)
B. "Jingle Bells" (8/8/46)Disc 3 (Columbia)A. "O Little Town of Bethlehem" (12/28/47)
B. "It Came Upon a Midnight Clear" (12/28/47)Disc 4 (Columbia)A. "Have Yourself a Merry Little Christmas" (7/3/47)
B. "Santa Claus is Comin' to Town" (12/28/47)

1948 10" LP record (Columbia)Side A"White Christmas"
"Jingle Bells"
"Silent Night"
"Adeste Fideles"Side B'''
"O Little Town of Bethlehem"
"It Came Upon a Midnight Clear"
"Have Yourself a Merry Little Christmas"
"Santa Claus is Comin' to Town"

1994 compilation album: CD / Track listing
 "White Christmas" (Irving Berlin) – 3:29+
 "Silent Night" (Josef Mohr, Franz X. Gruber) – 3:16+
 "Adeste Fideles (O, Come All Ye Faithful)" (Frederick Oakeley, John Francis Wade) – 2:36
 "Jingle Bells" (James Pierpont) – 2:35+
 "Have Yourself a Merry Little Christmas" (Ralph Blane, Hugh Martin) – 2:33
 "Christmas Dreaming (A Little Early This Year)" (Irving Gordon, Lester Lee) – 2:57
 "It Came Upon a Midnight Clear" (Edmund Sears, Richard Storrs Willis) – 3:31+
 "O Little Town of Bethlehem" (Phillips Brooks, Lewis Redner) – 3:03
 "Santa Claus is Coming to Town" (J. Fred Coots, Haven Gillespie) – 2:33+
 "Let It Snow! Let It Snow! Let It Snow!" (Sammy Cahn, Jule Styne) – 2:35
 Introduction by General Reynolds, Chief of Special Services – 0:59
 Medley: "O, Little Town of Bethlehem"/"Joy to the World"/"White Christmas" (Brooks, Redner)/(Isaac Watts, Lowell Mason)/(Berlin) – 5:15
 "Ave Maria" (Franz Schubert) – 3:28^
 "Winter Wonderland" (Felix Bernard, Richard B. Smith) – 2:03^
 "The Lord's Prayer" (Albert Hay Malotte) – 3:34^

+ previously unreleased alternate take

^ previously unreleased

Charts

References

External linksChristmas Songs by Sinatra'' on Discogs

1948 albums
Christmas albums by American artists
Pop Christmas albums
Christmas compilation albums
Columbia Records Christmas albums
Frank Sinatra compilation albums